Sterte is a part of Poole in Dorset, England. It is directly next to Poole Stadium and Holes Bay. It is near to the areas of Oakdale, Upton and Hamworthy.

References

Areas of Poole